The Journal of Neuroimmune Pharmacology is a quarterly peer-reviewed scientific journal covering research on the intersection of immunology, pharmacology, and neuroscience as they relate to each other. The journal occasionally publishes special thematic issues. It was established in 2006 and is published by Springer Science+Business Media.

Abstracting and indexing
The journal is abstracted and indexed in:

According to the Journal Citation Reports, the journal has a 2021 impact factor of 7.285.

References

External links

Immunology journals
Neuroscience journals
Pharmacology journals
English-language journals
Publications established in 2006
Quarterly journals
Springer Science+Business Media academic journals